Douglas Gordon "The Gleichen Cowboy" Young (October 1, 1908 – May 15, 1990) was a Canadian ice hockey defenceman who played mostly for the Detroit Red Wings of the National Hockey League.  Young was also captain of the Red Wings from 1935 to 1938.

Playing career

Junior hockey
Young had a great start to his hockey career when he was part of the 1926 Memorial Cup champion Calgary Canadians. He followed this feat by joining the Canadian Professional Hockey League as a member of the Kitchener Millionaires (later renamed the Toronto Millionaires) and playing sound defensive hockey. The IHL took notice and Young transferred to the Cleveland Indians to start the 1929 season. For two more seasons he continued to display his defensive talent until finally the NHL took notice.

Professional hockey
Within a two-month span in 1931, Young was claimed by the Philadelphia Quakers in an Inter-league draft, claimed by the New York Americans in the Dispersal Draft, and traded to the Detroit Falcons for Ron Martin. So finally, on October 18, 1931, Young had found his NHL home with the Detroit Falcons. In the 1931–32 season Young made his NHL debut and posted a career-high ten goals in his rookie campaign. He would continue to knock in a few goals and play sound defensive hockey for Detroit (now renamed the Detroit Red Wings) and in the 1935–36 season, he helped them win the Stanley Cup. Young missed most of the 1937 season with an injury, but his name was still engraved on the Stanley Cup. He was Captain of the Red Wings from 1935–38. He was selected to appear in his first All-Star Game in 1939.

Prior to 1940, Young was signed as a free agent by the Montreal Canadiens, where he would play his last 50 games in the NHL. Young was claimed on waivers by the Toronto Maple Leafs in 1940 and was set down to their farm team, the Providence Reds of the American Hockey League. Young finished out his career scoring 22 points for the Reds in the 1940–41 season.

Retirement
After his retirement in 1941 Doug Young went on to pursue a career as an On-Ice Official for the NHL and to work for the Detroit Red Wings home office.

Awards and achievements
 IHL First All-Star Team (1930)
 Won two Stanley Cups with the Detroit Red Wings (1936 & 1937)
 Selected to NHL All Star Game (1939)
 AHL First All-Star Team (1941)

Career statistics

Regular season and playoffs

External links
Doug's Bio on Hockey Database.com
Doug's Bio on Legends of Hockey.com

1908 births
1990 deaths
Canadian expatriate ice hockey players in the United States
Canadian ice hockey defencemen
Cleveland Indians (IHL) players
Detroit Red Wings captains
Detroit Falcons players
Detroit Red Wings players
Ice hockey people from Alberta
Kitchener Millionaires players
Montreal Canadiens players
Sportspeople from Medicine Hat
Providence Reds players
Stanley Cup champions
Toronto Millionaires players